Sister Jesme, born 11 June 1956, in Kerala She studied with rank in University of Calicut and completed M. Phil, Then she turned as teacher, joined as vice principal at Vimala College, Thrissur for the year 2002 to 2005. In 2005 she joined at St. Mary's College, Thrissur as Principal, served till 2008. She resigned from her post as Principal of St. Mary's College in Trichur.
She was a member of the Congregation of the Mother of Carmel (CMC) which she forced to leave for reasons of emotional torment, after 33 years as a nun., Sister Jesme decided to become a nun and dedicate her life in the service of God, as her beloved Jesus Christ, when she was barely in college. Her life as a nun and her experiences with the institution of the Catholic Church in Kerala are recounted in her book, Amen - The Autobiography of a Nun, Indian Express reviewing the book states that the book " details the humiliation, sexual abuse and mental torture at the seminary (Congregation of the Mother of Carmelites)., Sister Jesme took doctorate in English Literature. She known become as Dr. Sister Jesme.

Books 
2018-  Veendum Amen (Amen Again) Autobiography Part-2
 2016- Penmayude Vahikal  ( The paths of womanhood) Novel. 
 2015- Geil Holy Hell & I Article Collection 
 2013- Mazhavil Maanam (Rainbow Sky) Article Collection.
 2012- Pranaya Smarana  (Amorous Memories) Novel.
 2011- Amen (Tamil Version) Kalachuvadu Publishers.						
 2011- Njanum Oru Sthree  (I too am a woman) Article collection.
 2009- Amen (Malayalam)
 2009- Amen (English Version) by Penguin Books.
 2009- Amen (Hindi Version) by Penguin Books.                                        
 2009- Amen (Marathi Version) by Mehta Publishers.
 2005- At the foot of the cross (Anthology of poems) English Version.
 2004-  Narrative Aesthetics: A case Study ( Literary Theory & Criticism)
 2003- Rhapsody (Anthology of poems in English) 
 1999- A Cascade  (Anthology of poems in English)

References

Sources
 

Malayali people
1956 births
Living people
Women educators from Kerala
Educators from Kerala
20th-century Indian Roman Catholic nuns